Crazy is a spectrum of behaviors characterized by certain abnormal mental or behavioral patterns.

Crazy may also refer to:

Film 
 The Crazies (1973 film), a film about a biological weapon's effects on a small town
 Crazy (1999 film), a documentary by Heddy Honigmann
 Crazy (2000 film), a film by Hans-Christian Schmid
 C.R.A.Z.Y., a 2005 film by Jean-Marc Vallée
 Crazy (2007 film), a film by Rick Bieber
 The Crazies (2010 film), a remake of the 1973 film

Literature 
 Crazy Magazine (1973–1983), a comic magazine
 Crazy (novel), a 2010 novel by William Peter Blatty
 Crazy, a novel by Benjamin Lebert

Music 
 Crazy (calypsonian) (born 1944), calypso singer from Trinidad and Tobago

Albums 
 Crazy (Candy Dulfer album) (2011)
 Crazy (EP), a 2015 EP by 4Minute
 Crazy (Julio Iglesias album) (1994)
 Crazy (Daniele Negroni album) (2012)

Songs 
 "Crazy" (Aerosmith song) (1994)
 "Crazy" (Anggun song) (2008)
 "Crazy" (Gnarls Barkley song) (2006)
 "Crazy" (Franka Batelić song) (2018)
 "Crazy" (The Boys song) (1990)
 "Crazy" (Ricki-Lee Coulter song) (2012)
 "Crazy" (Dream song) (2003)
 "Crazy" (Eternal song) (1994)
 "Crazy" (Expatriate song) (2007)
 "Crazy" (From Ashes to New song) (2018)
 "Crazy" (Leah Haywood song) (2000)
 "Crazy" (Miki Howard song) (1988)
 "Crazy" (Icehouse song) (1987)
 "Crazy" (Javier song) (2003)
 "Crazy" (K-Ci and JoJo song) (2001)
 "Crazy" (K.Maro song) (2004)
 "Crazy" (Lost Frequencies and Zonderling song) (2017)
 "Crazy" (Lumidee song) (2007)
 "Crazy" (The Manhattans song) (1983)
 "Crazy" (Willie Nelson song), a 1961 song most popularly performed by Patsy Cline
 "Crazy" (Neu! song) (2010)
 "Crazy" (Kenny Rogers song) (1985)
 "Crazy" (Seal song), a 1991 song covered by Alanis Morissette in 2005
 "Loca" (Shakira song) or "Crazy" (2010)
 "Crazy" (Simple Plan song) (2004)
 "(You Drive Me) Crazy", a 1999 song by Britney Spears
 "Crazy", a 1985 song by the Adicts from Smart Alex
 "Crazy", a 1992 song by Barenaked Ladies from Gordon
 "Crazy", a 2005 song by Andy Bell from Electric Blue
 "Crazy", a 2014 song by Christopher from Told You So
 "Crazy", a 2004 song by Ciara from Goodies
 "Crazy", a 2014 song by Kat Dahlia from My Garden
 "Crazy", a 2011 song by Daughtry from Break the Spell
 "Crazy", a 1997 song by Alana Davis from Blame It on Me
 "Crazy", a 2019 song by Dune Rats from Hurry Up and Wait
 "Crazy", a 2004 song by Estelle from The 18th Day
 "Crazy", a 2006 song by Kevin Federline from Playing with Fire
 "Crazy", a 1985 song by Five Star from Luxury of Life
 "Crazy", a 1977 song by Dan Hill from Longer Fuse
 "Crazy", a 2010 song by James from The Night Before
 "Crazy", a 2017 song by Lil Pump from Lil Pump
 "Crazy", a 2019 song by Madonna from Madame X
 "Crazy", a 1980 song by Men at Work, released as a B-side to "Down Under"
 "Crazy", a 1997 song by Yvette Michele from My Dream
 "Crazy (A Suitable Case for Treatment)", a 1981 song by Nazareth from the soundtrack to the film Heavy Metal
 "Crazy", a 2007 song by Ne-Yo from Because of You
 "Crazy", a 1983 song by Pylon from Chomp
 "Crazy", a 1993 song by Joe Satriani from Time Machine
 "Crazy", a 2006 song by Snoop Dogg from Tha Blue Carpet Treatment
 "Crazy", a 2011 song by Alexandra Stan from Saxobeats
 "Crazy", a 1982 song by Supertramp from ...Famous Last Words...
 "Crazy", a 1994 song by Usher from Usher
 "Crazy", a 1980 song by Tom Scott from ''Stir Crazy (film)

Places
 Crazy Creek, a stream in Utah
 Crazy Lake, a lake in California

See also 
 Craze (disambiguation)
 Krazy (disambiguation)